Aboubacar Ibrahim International University is a private university, it aims to provide higher education and scientific research service to students all over the world. Its headquarters are located in the city of Maradi in the Republic of Niger. The university represents an alternative for many secondary school graduates, who go far to reach higher education.

Objectives 
University objectives:

 Contribute on the educational level to confront the extremist intellectual currents and spread the culture of peace and a correct understanding of Islam.
 Strengthen the spirit of scientific research, analysis, scientific curiosity, and creative thinking.
 Prepare the student for professional and economic professionalism and for scientific planning, by introducing technical subjects into the educational content to try to link theoretical and applied to teach.
 Encourage the general culture of the pupil by teaching them morality, civic and artistic education so that they become a citizen aware of their responsibilities capable of preserving their authenticity and cultural heritage.

Faculties 
The university has six (6) faculties:

 Faculty of Educational Sciences
 Department of teaching didactics
 Department of educational administration and planning

 Faculty of Sharia and Law
 Department of Islamic Finance
 Department of Civil Law
 Department of Islamic Law
 Department of Islamic Studies

 Faculty of Arts and Humanities
 Department of Sociology
 Department of French
 Department of Geography
 Department of Communication

 Faculty of Administrative and Economic Sciences
 Department of Islamic Economics
 Department of Public Administration
 Department of Economics
 Department of international relations

 Faculty of Technical and Environmental Sciences
 Department of Computer Science
 Department of Physics (renewable energy)
 Department of Biology (environmental management)

 Faculty of Health Sciences
 Department of Nursing
 Department of Midwifery Sciences
 Department of Community Health and safety
 Department of Environmental health and development

References 

https://free.facebook.com/messages/?pageID=111046031277987&ref_component=mfreebasic_home_header&ref_page=MMessagingThreadlistController&refid=11

Universities in Niger